In applied mathematics, a damping matrix is a matrix corresponding to any of certain systems of linear ordinary differential equations.  A damping matrix is defined as follows.  If the system has n degrees of freedom un and is under application of m damping forces. Each force can be expressed as follows:

 

It yields in matrix form;

 

where C is the damping matrix composed by the damping coefficients:

References 
(fr) Mechanics of structures and seisms

Mechanical engineering
Classical mechanics